Aykut Öztürk (born 7 November 1987) is a Turkish-German footballer who currently plays for FC Gießen.

Early life
Öztürk was born to Turkish parents in Ehringshausen and raised in Aßlar.

Career
He made his debut on the professional league level in the 2. Bundesliga for SV Wehen Wiesbaden on 18 May 2008 when he came on as a substitute in the 86th minute in a game against SC Freiburg. On 25 June 2010, Öztürk left SV Wehen Wiesbaden and signed in the land of his forefathers Turkey with Konyaspor. After two months with Konyaspor, he returned to Germany and played for Eintracht Wetzlar. On 2 February 2011, Öztürk signed with 3. Liga club FC Carl Zeiss Jena and scored in his first game his debut goal in 3–0 home victory against SV Sandhausen, the club he joined only a few months later.

After being released by Sivasspor in summer 2014, Öztürk was without a club for roughly half a year. After two weeks being on trial, on 26 January 2015, he was given a contract by then last placed 3. Liga side Jahn Regensburg. He signed for the remainder of the season with an extension clause in case of Regensburg staying in the league. After Regensburg was relegated, he joined FSV Zwickau.

Career statistics

References

1987 births
Living people
Turkish footballers
Association football forwards
German people of Turkish descent
German footballers
SV Wehen Wiesbaden players
Konyaspor footballers
FC Carl Zeiss Jena players
SV Sandhausen players
FC Rot-Weiß Erfurt players
Sivasspor footballers
SSV Jahn Regensburg players
FSV Zwickau players
FC Gießen players
2. Bundesliga players
3. Liga players
Süper Lig players